Surrender is the seventh album by singer Debby Boone and her second Christian music album. It was released in 1983 and peaked at number seven on the Top Contemporary Christian chart.

Track listing
 "O Come All Ye Faithful" (Rich Mullins) [4:08]
 "Keep the Flame Burning" (David Baroni, Connie Nelson) [4:41]
 "Can You Reach My Friend" (Billy Sprague, Jim Weber) [4:08]
 "Lift Him Up" (Russ Hollingsworth, John Rosasco) [4:24]
 "Wounded Soldier" (Dony McGuire, Reba Rambo) [4:58]
 "Surrender" (Cloninger, Bill Purse) [3:34]
 "Keep Rollin' On" (Harry Browning) [4:06]
 "Find a Hurt and Heal It" (David Baroni, Niles Borop) [2:39]
 "O Holy One" (Marty Goetz) [4:12]
 "Blessing" (Pam Mark Hall, Greg Laughery) [3:02]

Production credits

Engineer
 Jim Baird
 Gene Eichelberger
 Brent King
 Jack Joseph Puig

Mastering
 Doug Sax

Concert Master
 Gavyn Wright

Strings
 Martyn Ford

References

1983 albums
Debby Boone albums